Ayesha Naseem (born 7 August 2004) is a Pakistani cricketer. In January 2020, at the age of 15, she was selected in Pakistan's squad for the 2020 ICC Women's T20 World Cup. She made her Women's Twenty20 International (WT20I) debut for Pakistan, against Thailand, on 3 March 2020. In December 2020, she was named in Pakistan's squad for their series against South Africa. Later the same month, she was shortlisted as one of the Women's Emerging Cricketer of the Year for the 2020 PCB Awards.

In June 2021, she was named in Pakistan's squad for their series against the West Indies. She made her Women's One Day International (WODI) debut on 12 July 2021, for Pakistan against the West Indies. In May 2022, she was named in Pakistan's team for the cricket tournament at the 2022 Commonwealth Games in Birmingham, England.

References

2004 births
Living people
Pakistani women cricketers
Pakistan women One Day International cricketers
Pakistan women Twenty20 International cricketers
Abbottabad women cricketers
Cricketers at the 2022 Commonwealth Games
Commonwealth Games competitors for Pakistan